The 48th annual Berlin International Film Festival was held from 11 to 22 February 1998. The festival opened with the Irish film The Boxer by Jim Sheridan. Francis Ford Coppola's The Rainmaker was selected as the closing night film. The Golden Bear was awarded to Brazilian-French film Central Station directed by Walter Salles. The retrospective dedicated to Siodmak Bros., titled Siodmak Bros. Berlin – London – Paris – Hollywood was shown at the festival.

Jury

The following people were announced as being on the jury for the festival:
 Ben Kingsley, actor (United Kingdom) - Jury President
 Senta Berger, actress and producer (Austria)
 Li Cheuk-to, art director of the Hong Kong International Film Festival (Hong Kong)
 Leslie Cheung, actor and musician (Hong Kong)
 Héctor Olivera, director and screenwriter (Argentina)
 Helmut Dietl, director (Germany)
 Brigitte Roüan, director, actress and screenwriter (France)
 Annette Insdorf, producer (France)
 Maya Turovskaya, historian and film critic (Ukraine)
 Maurizio Nichetti, actor, screenwriter, director and producer (Italy)
 Michael Williams-Jones, president of Miramax Films (United Kingdom)

Films in competition
The following films were in competition for the Golden Bear and Silver Bear awards:

Key
{| class="wikitable" width="550" colspan="1"
| style="background:#FFDEAD;" align="center"| †
|Winner of the main award for best film in its section
|-
| colspan="2"| The opening and closing films are screened during the opening and closing ceremonies respectively.
|}

Awards

The following prizes were awarded by the Jury:
 Golden Bear: Central Station by Walter Salles
 Silver Bear – Special Jury Prize: Wag the Dog by Barry Levinson
 Silver Bear for Best Director: Neil Jordan for The Butcher Boy
 Silver Bear for Best Actress: Fernanda Montenegro for Central Station
 Silver Bear for Best Actor: Samuel L. Jackson for Jackie Brown
 Silver Bear for an outstanding single achievement: Matt Damon for Good Will Hunting
 Silver Bear for an outstanding artistic contribution: Alain Resnais for On connaît la chanson
 Alfred Bauer Prize: Yue kuai le, yue duo luo
 Honourable Mention:
 Sławomir Idziak for I Want You
 Isabella Rossellini for Left Luggage
 Eamonn Owens for The Butcher Boy
 Blue Angel Award: Left Luggage by Jeroen Krabbé
 Honorary Golden Bear: Catherine Deneuve
 Berlinale Camera:
 Carmelo Romero
 Curt Siodmak
FIPRESCI Award
Sada by Nobuhiko Obayashi

References

External links
48th Berlin International Film Festival 1998
1998 Berlin International Film Festival
Berlin International Film Festival:1998 at Internet Movie Database

48
1998 film festivals
1998 in Berlin
Berl
Berlin